The 2001 Big East men's basketball tournament took place at Madison Square Garden in New York City. Its winner received the Big East Conference's automatic bid to the 2001 NCAA tournament. It is a single-elimination tournament with four rounds and the two highest seeds in each division received byes in the first round. The six teams with the best conference records in each division were invited to participate for a total of 12 teams. Teams were seeded by division. Boston College had the best regular season conference record and received the East #1 seed, while Notre Dame received the West #1 seed.

Boston College defeated Pittsburgh in the championship game 79–57 for its second and final Big East tournament championship.

Bracket

* denotes an overtime (OT) period.

Note: By finishing in last place during the regular season in their respective divisions, Virginia Tech and Rutgers did not qualify for the tournament.

Awards
Dave Gavitt Trophy (Most Outstanding Player): Troy Bell, Boston College

All-Tournament Team
 Jonathan Beerbohm, Boston College
 Ricardo Greer, Pittsburgh
 Eddie Griffin, Seton Hall
 Preston Shumpert, Syracuse
 Xavier Singletary, Boston College

References

External links
2001 Big East Men's Basketball Tournament website

Tournament
Big East men's basketball tournament
Basketball in New York City
College sports in New York City
Sports competitions in New York City
Sports in Manhattan
Big East men's basketball tournament
Big East men's basketball tournament
2000s in Manhattan
Madison Square Garden